An independence referendum was held in Eritrea, at the time part of Ethiopia, between 23 and 25 April 1993. The result was 99.83% in favour, with a 98.5% turnout. Independence from Ethiopia was declared on 27 April.

Conduct
The UN Observer Mission to Verify the Referendum in Eritrea (UNOVER) was established pursuant to General Assembly resolution 47/114 of 16 December 1992 and lasted until 25 April 1993. The goals of the mission were to verify the impartiality of the referendum, report claims of irregularities, and verify the counting, computation and announcement of the results.

The referendum was completed under budget, and was considered free and fair.

Results

UN Report

Referendum Commission of Eritrea

By area

See also
Eritrean War of Independence

References

1993 in Eritrea
Eritrea
Eritrea
Independence referendum
Independence referendum
April 1993 events in Africa